Bisenzio may refer to:

 the Italian name of Ancient Visentium (also spelled Bisentium), already an Etruscan city
 the first name (and see?) of the former Roman Catholic Diocese of Castro del Lazio (also known as Castrum in Tuscia, or just Castro)
 Bisenzio (river), a Tuscan tributary of the Arno
 Bisenzio, a frazione of Lavenone, Lombardy, Italy